Stefan Denković  (born 16 June 1991) is a Montenegrin football striker who plays in Georgia for Dinamo Batumi.

Club career
An ethnic Montenegrin born in Belgrade, Serbia, he started playing in the youth team of Red Star Belgrade and he made his senior debut in 2009 when he was loaned to Red Star's farm team, FK Sopot, where he played two seasons in the Serbian League Belgrade, Serbian third tier before moving to Israel in summer 2011. There he made his competitive debut on 20 August 2011 as a substitute in Hapoel Haifa's 1–0 loss to Ironi Kiryat Shmona.

In spring 2016 he played with Osotspa Samut Prakan in Thai Premier League, and in summer he returned to Europe and joined FK Zemun from the Serbian First League.

International career
He has been a member of the Montenegrin under-19 national team since 2009.

Honours
Hapoel Haifa
Toto Cup: 2012–13

References

External links

Stefan Denković - One

1991 births
Living people
Footballers from Belgrade
Association football forwards
Montenegrin footballers
Montenegro youth international footballers
Red Star Belgrade footballers
Hapoel Haifa F.C. players
FK Vojvodina players
Puskás Akadémia FC players
Zawisza Bydgoszcz players
Stefan Denkovic
FK Zemun players
FK Bokelj players
FK Sutjeska Nikšić players
FK Spartak Subotica players
FC Kaisar players
Israeli Premier League players
Serbian SuperLiga players
Nemzeti Bajnokság I players
Ekstraklasa players
Stefan Denkovic
Serbian First League players
Montenegrin First League players
Kazakhstan Premier League players
Montenegrin expatriate footballers
Expatriate footballers in Israel
Montenegrin expatriate sportspeople in Israel
Expatriate footballers in Hungary
Montenegrin expatriate sportspeople in Hungary
Expatriate footballers in Poland
Montenegrin expatriate sportspeople in Poland
Expatriate footballers in Thailand
Montenegrin expatriate sportspeople in Thailand
Expatriate footballers in Kazakhstan
Montenegrin expatriate sportspeople in Kazakhstan